The 1996 Embassy World Professional Darts Championship was held from 1–7 January 1996 at the Lakeside Country Club in Frimley Green, Surrey and was won by the number six seed Steve Beaton.  Beaton, who suffered a first round loss in the previous two World Championships as the number one seed, defeated Co Stompé, 1994 champion John Part, and future champions Martin Adams and Andy Fordham before beating defending champion Richie Burnett 6–3 in sets in the final.

Seeds
  Richie Burnett
  Andy Fordham
  Martin Adams
  Mike Gregory
  Raymond van Barneveld
  Steve Beaton
  Colin Monk
  Kevin Painter

Prize money
The prize money was £145,200.

Champion: £36,000
Runner-Up: £18,000
Semi-Finalists (2): £8,400
Quarter-Finalists (4): £4,200
Last 16 (8): £3,200
Last 32 (16): £2,000

There was also a 9 Dart Checkout prize of £52,000, along with a High Checkout prize of £1,600.

The results

References

BDO World Darts Championships
BDO World Darts Championship
BDO World Darts Championship
BDO World Darts Championship
Sport in Surrey
Frimley Green